Poladpur is a census town in Raigad district in the Indian state of Maharashtra.

Etymology 
Poladpur is a town named after Poladjung, one of the knights in the army of Mughal Emperor Aurangzeb. He was beaten and buried at Poladpur during the Shivaji Era by the elite warriors of the Chitre clan. Hence, the name of the town. Grave of Poladjung can still be seen on the road beyond the town council joining national highway on the banks of the river Savitri.
Poladpur has been the native place for Chitre clan since many centuries. There is a temple of Kalbhairav-JyogeshwariDevi whom the Chitres belong to. The temple lies on Mumbai-Goa National highway. Poladpur also has Sadguru temple build by Prabhakar Sheth. This temple has 70 idols of saints and Hindu gods found across India.
It is a starting point to Mahabaleshwar. The better scenic view to Mahabaleshwar.

Demographics
 India census, Poladpur had a population of 5,944 . Males constitute 50% of the population and females 50%. Poladpur has an average literacy rate of 74%, higher than the national average of 59.5%: male literacy is 79%, and female literacy is 69%. In Poladpur, 13% of the population is under 6 years of age.

Location 
Poladpur is Located on Mumbai Goa Highway i.e. NH 17 and about seventeen kilometres from Mahad town and about 200 kilometres from Mumbai. The Ambenali ghat connects Poladpur to Mahabaleshwar. The Kashedi Ghat On NH 17 Starts after the end of Poladpur. So Many ST buses halt here before proceeding to Kashedi Ghat. It is on the bank of Savitri River.
Geographically Poladpur is on the border of Raigad district in Maharashtra State. It is the city connecting Ratnagiri district at its south and Satara district at east. It is one of the fast growing cities in district raigad.

Mahabaleshwar one of the most popular tourist destinations in India is around 40 km from Poladpur city. From Poladpur one can reach to Pratapgadh fort, a fort built by Shivaji which is 15 km from city.

Historical Importance 
First biographer of Shivaji who wrote Shivbharat hailed from Poladpur. He took samadhi at Poladpur. One of Shivaji's Asht Pradhan, Khando Ballal, also known as Balaji awaji Chitre was from Poladpur. His descendants still live there. There also live the members of Mamdhare family.

References

 

Cities and towns in Raigad district
Talukas in Maharashtra